10 Reavell Place is a , 12 storey residential building located on the River Gipping, Ipswich, Suffolk, England. The building consists of residential units with no commercial outlets. The building is one of the tallest buildings in Ipswich.

Location
This is the tallest building in the development along Raleigh Road, in the new 'Voyage' development. The development also includes the Sir Bobby Robson Bridge which connects the development to the Ipswich Village Development.

History
10 Reavell Place sits on the old grounds of the former Compair Reavell site, hence its name. The Compair site occupied the site the 'Voyage' development sits on. The company moved out in 2005 to a new location on the outskirts of the town. Its alternate name is Voyage Block G as it is the seventh residential building in the development. The other buildings in development, Voyage Block's A-F are low rise residential buildings built in a similar modern style. Allglass (Anglia) Limited were awarded the contract for the installation of the windows as well as overseeing other design aspects by Fairview New Homes Ltd. The building achieved an EPC ENERGY RATING B.

See also

List of tallest buildings and structures in Ipswich

References

Buildings and structures completed in 2010
Residential buildings in Ipswich
Residential buildings completed in 2010